Troubled Sleep (published in the United Kingdom as Iron in the Soul is a 1949 novel by Jean-Paul Sartre. It is the third part in the trilogy Les chemins de la liberté (The Roads to Freedom).

"The third novel in Sartre's monumental Roads to Freedom series, Troubled Sleep powerfully depicts the fall of France in 1940, and the anguished feelings of a group of Frenchmen whose pre-war apathy gives way to a consciousness of the dignity of individual resistance — to the German occupation and to fate in general — and solidarity with people similarly oppressed." — Random House

1949 novels
French philosophical novels
Novels by Jean-Paul Sartre
Novels set during World War II
Novels set in France
Fiction set in 1940
Novels set in the 1940s
Éditions Gallimard books